9 is a 2002 Turkish crime film directed by Ümit Ünal.

Cast 
 Ali Poyrazoğlu - Firuz
 Cezmi Baskın - Salim
 Serra Yılmaz - Saliha
 Fikret Kuşkan - Tunç
 Ozan Güven - Kaya 
  - Kirpi (Spiky)

References

External links 

2002 crime thriller films
2002 films
2002 crime drama films
Turkish crime drama films
Turkish crime thriller films
2000s Turkish-language films